Strategy Markup Language (StratML) is an XML-based standard vocabulary and schema for the information commonly contained in strategic and performance plans and reports. StratML Part 1 specifies the elements of strategic plans, including:  mission, vision, values, goals, objectives, and stakeholders.  Part 2 extends Part 1 to include the additional elements required for performance plans and reports, including stakeholder roles and performance indicators.

Originally adopted as an American national standard (ANSI/AIIM 21:2009) Part 1, Strategic Plans, was published as an international standard (ISO 17469–1) on February 11, 2015, with minor changes from the ANSI version.  On November 13, 2015, the ANSI version of Part 1 was replaced with the ISO version (ANSI/AIIM/ISO 17469-1).  On January 9, 2017, the ISO changes and several additional enhancements were approved for incorporation into Part 2, Performance Plans and Reports (ANSI/AIIM 22).  Internationalization of Part 2 will depend upon sufficient support from other nations in the ISO process.

The vision of the StratML standard is: "A worldwide web of intentions, stakeholders, and results."  Its more explicit purposes include enabling strategic alignment through literal linkages between performance objectives and the business records supporting them. Although the initial focus has been on the plans and reports that U.S. federal agencies are required to compile and maintain under the Government Performance and Results Act (GPRA), the standard has been specified generically so as to be applicable not only to all organizations, worldwide, but also to individuals who choose to lead mission/goal-directed lives.

Section 10 of the  GPRA Modernization Act (GPRAMA) requires U.S. federal agencies to publish their strategic and performance plans and reports in machine-readable format.  StratML is such a format.

In February 2022 the Data Foundation transmitted to the President's Management Council (PMC) a letter with the following conclusion: "Applying international standards as intended by Section 10 of GPRA modernization will not only comply with the statute, but will also enable the U.S. performance infrastructure to be a model for countries around the world looking for leadership on how to communicate performance information in the 21st Century."

See also

 Benefit corporation
 Collective action
 Collective impact
 Collective intelligence
 Complex contagion
 Goal
 Holacracy
 Machine-Readable Documents
 Mass collaboration
 Mission statement
 Objectives & Key Results (OKR)
 OMB Circular A-11
 Performance indicator
 Performance management
 
 Role
 Sociocracy
 Stakeholder analysis
 Stakeholder (corporate)
 Stakeholder management
 Stakeholder theory
 Strategic alignment
 Vision statement
 XML editor

References

External links
 StratML.us home page
 OMB Circular A-11, section 230.18, July 2017 - How should agencies publish Strategic Plans and deliver them to Congress? The GPRA Modernization Act of 2010 requires agencies to make the Strategic Plan available on both the public website of the agency as well as on a central website (e.g., Performance.gov) in machine readable format, and notify the President and Congress of its availability.

Markup languages